NSTP may refer to:

 National Service Training Program, a Philippine civic education program
 New Straits Times Press, a Malaysian conglomerate of publishing companies